The Ariano Suassuna Trophy or Ariano Suassuna Cup is an annual friendly football competition held in January, before the football season in Brazil.

The competition is hosted by Sport Recife and is named in honour of Ariano Suassuna, a Brazilian playwright, author and one of Sport Recife's most famous fans.

Editions

Performance by team

Performance by nations

References

External links
Sport Club do Recife official page

Brazilian football friendly trophies
Sport Club do Recife
2015 establishments in Brazil
Recurring sporting events established in 2015